The Sepang GP2 round was a GP2 Series race that ran from on the Sepang International Circuit track in Sepang, Malaysia.

Winners

Fastest Laps

Pole Positions

Notes

GP2 Series rounds